Amy Wright ( Hatten, born January 28, 1964) is an American curler from Duluth, Minnesota.

Curling career
Wright made her United States Nationals debut in 1984 and competed on the winning team. Since 1984 she has competed in sixteen more US Nationals, with her last appearance in 2010. In addition to her team's victory in 1984, Wright has also been victorious in 1992 and 2000. She has been a runner-up once and won the Bronze medal at the 2009 Nationals, which doubled as the Olympic Trials for the 2010 Vancouver Olympics.

As the United States champion Wright has made three appearances at the Curling World Championships. Eight years later in  she returned to the worlds, winning the silver medal and receiving the Frances Brodie Sportsmanship Award. At the  her team placed sixth with a 4–5 record.

After a seventh-place finish at the 2006 US Nationals Wright announced she would take a break from competitive curling. However, as the Vancouver Olympics neared, she joined Courtney George, Jordan Moulton, and Patti Luke to make an attempt to represent the United States. At the 2010 United States Olympic Curling Trials Wright's team finished in third.

Personal life 
Wright is married to fellow curler Tim Wright, they have two children. She earned a bachelor's degree in business and economics.

Teammates 
2010 United States Olympic Curling Trials

2010 United States Women's Curling Championship

Courtney George, Third

Jordan Moulton, Second

Patti Luke, Lead

Amanda McLean, Alternate

Note: Amanda McLean served as the Alternate only for the 2010 Nationals

References

External links
 

1964 births
Living people
American female curlers
Sportspeople from Duluth, Minnesota
American curling champions
21st-century American women